State Road 14 (SR 14) is a northeast-southwest route in Madison County, Florida.  The western terminus is near an interchange with Interstate 10 (unsigned SR 8) and County Road 14 (CR 14) near Madison; the eastern terminus is an intersection with Duval Street (SR 53) in the city of Madison itself.

Route description

The southwestern continuation of SR 14 (which ends at an interchange with Interstate 10 at exit 251) is County Road 14, intersecting with U.S. Route 221 (US 221, unsigned SR 55) in Shady Grove before taking a more westerly route (with the former State Road 14A, now County Road 14A, straddling the Econfina River for four miles (6 km) just west of Shady Grove) and reaching its terminus, an intersection with US 19/27 (unsigned SR 20) in Eridu.

An additional segment of former SR 14 is located in Taylor County, running from the bridge over the Aucilla River at the Jefferson County line (the road continuing north as CR 257) south across US 98 to a terminus at the Econfina River State Park.

Major intersections

State Road 14 Truck

From the eastern terminus of SR 14 southeastward, part of SR 53 carries the additional designation of State Road 14 Truck, a rare bannered state road in Florida. The truck route then turns west on Harvey Greene Drive to rejoin SR 14.

References

External links

014
014
014
014